Ain Bni Mathar (Berber: Tiṭ En Ayt Meṭher) is a town and municipality in Jerada Province, Eastern region, Morocco. It is located 81 km south of Wejda and 36 km from the Algerian border.

At the time of the 2004 census, it had a population of 13,526.

In 2011 the first Thermo Solar Combined Cycle Power Plant of Morocco was constructed near the town.

References

Municipalities of Morocco
Populated places in Jerada Province